Cierszewo  is a village in the administrative district of Gmina Brudzeń Duży, within Płock County, Masovian Voivodeship, in east-central Poland.

The village had a population of 21(last recorded in 2008).

References

Cierszewo